Goodbye is an album by vibraphonist Milt Jackson recorded in 1973 (with one track from 1972) and released on the CTI label.

Reception
The Allmusic review by Thom Jurek awarded the album 3 stars stating " Milt Jackson's second entry on the CTI label is also one of its highlights. This is one of Creed Taylor's finest productions both in terms of material and sidemen".

Track listing
All compositions by Milt Jackson except as indicated
 "Detour Ahead" (Lou Carter, Herb Ellis, Johnny Frigo) - 8:00 
 "Goodbye" (Gordon Jenkins) - 9:21
 "Old Devil Moon" (E. Y. Harburg, Burton Lane) - 5:50 
 "S.K.J." - 6:47 
 "Opus de Funk" (Horace Silver) - 6:46 
Recorded at Rudy Van Gelder Studio in Englewood Cliffs, New Jersey on December 12, 1972 (track 4) and December, 1973 (tracks 1, 2, 3 & 5)

Personnel
Milt Jackson – vibes
Ron Carter - bass
Freddie Hubbard (track 4) - trumpet
Hubert Laws (tracks 1, 2, 3 & 5) - flute 
Cedar Walton (tracks 1, 2, 3 & 5); Herbie Hancock (track 4) - piano 
Steve Gadd (tracks 1, 2, 3 & 5); Billy Cobham (track 4) - drums

References °

CTI Records albums
Milt Jackson albums
1974 albums
Albums produced by Creed Taylor